Donovan Rellum (or Donnevan Rellum; born 4 January 2000) is a Surinamese professional footballer who plays as a midfielder for SVB Eerste Divisie club Transvaal and the Suriname national team.

References 

2000 births
Living people
Surinamese footballers
Association football midfielders
S.V. Transvaal players
SVB Eerste Divisie players
Suriname youth international footballers
Suriname international footballers